Sara Van de Vel (born 6 August 1994) is a Belgian professional racing cyclist and triathlete, who currently rides for UCI Women's Continental Team . She rode in the women's time trial event at the 2020 UCI Road World Championships.

Major results

2021
 1st Binche–Chimay–Binche pour Dames

References

External links
 

1994 births
Living people
Belgian female cyclists
Belgian female triathletes
Place of birth missing (living people)
Cyclists from Antwerp Province